British Columbia Southern Interior (formerly known as Southern Interior, Kootenay—Boundary—Okanagan and West Kootenay—Okanagan) was a federal electoral district in the province of British Columbia, Canada, that had been represented in the House of Commons of Canada from 1997 to 2015.

Description

Regions included in the riding are the Similkameen, the southern half of the South Okanagan region, the Boundary Country, all of the West Kootenay region, the Slocan Valley, Lower (but not Upper) Arrow Lake, and including the east shore of Kootenay Lake from opposite Kaslo northwards.

Municipalities within the riding are Princeton, Keremeos, Oliver, Osoyoos, Greenwood, Grand Forks, Trail, Rossland, Warfield, Montrose, Fruitvale, Castlegar, Nelson, Salmo, Slocan, New Denver, Silverton, and Kaslo.

History
This riding was created in 1996 as "West Kootenay—Okanagan" from parts of Kootenay West—Revelstoke and Okanagan—Similkameen—Merritt ridings.

It consisted of:
 Kootenay Boundary Regional District;
 subdivisions A and B of Central Kootenay Regional District; and
 the eastern part of Subdivision B of Okanagan-Similkameen Regional District.

It was renamed "Kootenay—Boundary—Okanagan" in 1998.

In the 2003 redistribution, the riding was replaced by the new riding of Southern Interior, with a small part being redistributed into Kootenay—Columbia and a small part added from Okanagan—Coquihalla.

In 2004, its name was changed to "British Columbia Southern Interior".

Members of Parliament

Election results

British Columbia Southern Interior

		

|- bgcolor="white"

|align="left" colspan=2|NDP gain from Conservative
|align="right"|Swing
|align="right"|+15.6
|align="right"|

Southern Interior

Kootenay—Boundary—Okanagan

West Kootenay—Okanagan

See also
 List of Canadian federal electoral districts
 Past Canadian electoral districts
 Okanagan (electoral districts)

References

 Library of Parliament Riding Profile (1996-1998)
 Library of Parliament Riding Profile (1998-2003)
 Library of Parliament Riding Profile (2003-2004)
 Expenditures - 2000
 Expenditures – 1997
 Expenditures - 2004

Notes

External links
 Website of the Parliament of Canada
 Riding map archived by Elections Canada

Former federal electoral districts of British Columbia
Castlegar, British Columbia
Nelson, British Columbia